is a Buddhist temple in Ukyo-ku, Kyoto, Japan. In 811 Kūkai is said to have founded a temple, then Honen altered it to the present Nenbutsuji. Situated high on a hill overlooking the city from the northwest, it sits in an area where since the Heian period people abandoned the bodies of the dead, exposing them to the wind and rain. Now, some eight thousand Buddhist statuettes, which had been scattered around Adashino then collected about 1903, memorialize the souls of the dead. During its well-known 'sento kuyo' ceremony dedicated to the spirits of the dead on the evenings of 23 and 24 August, about ten thousand stone statues are lit up with candles.

In its name, Adashino is a place name; Nenbutsu refers to a mantra (recitation of a buddha's name).

Access
17, Adashino-chō, Saga-Toriimoto, Ukyō-ku, Kyoto
Kyoto Bus (not Kyoto City
Bus) Toriimoto Stop: 5 minutes walk

See also 
 For an explanation of terms concerning Japanese Buddhism, Japanese Buddhist art, and Japanese Buddhist temple architecture, see the Glossary of Japanese Buddhism.

External links

Pictures and discussion in English
Pictures in German and English
Photos and historical information on Adashino Nenbutsuji

Buddhist temples in Kyoto